Sphodros rufipes, sometimes called the red legged purseweb spider, is a mygalomorph spider from the southern United States, though it has been photographed as far north as Indiana,  Missouri, New Jersey, Minnesota, Tennessee, Delaware, Louisiana, and Tuckernuck Island in Massachusetts [West Virginia]. A recent sighting shows that these spiders can also be found in Canada. Recent sighting also in Kansas.

The species name rufipes is Latin for "red foot".

This spider is also sometimes known as Sphodros (Atypus) bicolor, a synonym.

Description
These spiders are solid and strong-looking and their bodies are black. The males have distinctive long red or red-orange legs, and the females have black legs. Females are known to reach a length of about 25 mm, or just under an inch, though they may also get slightly larger. Like other spiders in its infraorder mygalomorph, it has fangs that point straight down rather than crossing.

Behavior
This spider has a distinctive method of catching its prey. It spins a tunnel of silk against the side of a tree or supported by stones or other convenient objects, and waits for its prey to land or climb on the side of the tunnel. Then the spider bites through the silk walls and pulls the prey inside. These spiders rarely leave their webs for any reason other than mating.

Notes

References
 (1980). A revision of the American spiders of the family Atypidae (Araneae, Mygalomorphae). American Museum Novitates 2704. Abstract - PDF (12Mb)
 (2009): The world spider catalog, version 9.5. American Museum of Natural History.

External links

Forum about S. rufipes
General Purseweb Spiders with information on Sphodros rufipes

Atypidae
Spiders of North America
Spiders described in 1829